The Black Marquee were an English alternative rock outfit/musical collaboration formed in Manchester, England.

The Black Marquee had their own residency which became relatively popular. The first night featured a performance  from Nick McCabe of The Verve and Damo Suzuki from Can. The night was known for its well designed posters. The nights were held at The Night and Day Café on Oldham Street, Manchester.

Musical style
Although their sound is generally classified as indie rock or psychedelic music, the band have a colourful range of styles and influences, such as 1960s rock.

References

External links

English rock music groups